Erol Mütercimler (born 1954 in Kars, Turkey) is a Turkish journalist, columnist and academic. He is a retired naval officer. In 2009 he was charged in the second indictment of the Ergenekon trials.

Mütercimler is "widely credited as being the first person to have written about Ergenekon", initially describing it in an interview in Aydınlık in 1997, during public discussion of the Susurluk scandal. Mütercimler said he heard of the original organization's existence from retired general Memduh Ünlütürk (who was assassinated in 1991), who was involved in the anti-communist Ziverbey interrogations following the 1971 coup. In 2012 he testified that he had initially dismissed the organization, but that Admiral Kemal Kayacan (assassinated in 1992) had told him to take it seriously, calling it "the name of the organization that plots everything".

Books
 Gençler İçin Fikrimizin Rehberi (2013), Alfa Basım Yayım Dağıtım. 
 Ertuğrul Faciası: 21.Yüzyıla Doğru Türkiye - Japonya İlişkisi (2010), Alfa Basım Yayım Dağıtım. 
 Gelibolu 1915 (Ciltli) (2010), Alfa Basım Yayım Dağıtım. 
 Komplo Teorileri: Aynanın Ardında Kalan Gerçekler (2010), Alfa Basım Yayım Dağıtım. 
 Satılık Ada Kıbrıs: Kıbrıs Barış Harekatının Bilinmeyen Yönleri (2009), Alfa Basım Yayım Dağıtım. 
 Destanlaşan Gemiler (1987)

References 

1954 births
Living people
People from Kars
Turkish journalists
Turkish columnists
Turkish writers
Turkish people of Azerbaijani descent